Emilio (Emi) Grau Sala (1911, Barcelona - 1975, Paris) was a Catalan painter.  He studied at the :sp:Escuela de Bellas Artes de Barcelona.  With his wife Ángeles Santos Torroella he fled to Paris at the outbreak of the Spanish Civil War.

He was a famous colorist (oil painting, watercolor and pastel) and illustrator. In the French Salon "Comparaisons", he was a member of the group of Maurice Boitel.

References

External links

1911 births
1975 deaths
20th-century Catalan painters